Hayato Nakamura (中村 隼, born November 18, 1991) is a Japanese football player.

Club statistics
Updated to 23 February 2016.

References

External links

1991 births
Living people
Association football people from Saitama Prefecture
Japanese footballers
J1 League players
J2 League players
Montedio Yamagata players
V-Varen Nagasaki players
Association football goalkeepers